T in the Park 2005 is a weekend music festival which took place from 9–10 July 2005 in Balado, Kinross.

Tickets
Tickets for the 2005 event sold out in record time, just four days after going on sale, five months in advance of the festival. The event saw around 69,000 people a day watching more than 170 bands over 10 stages. It was named best festival in that year's UK Festival Awards, beating the Glastonbury Festival for the first time.

Line up
Some of the bands performing included Green Day, who headlined Sunday night, Travis, The Killers, Keane, El Presidente, The Prodigy, New Order, Fightstar, James Brown, Echo & the Bunnymen, Two Lone Swordsmen, DJ Sneak, Richie Hawtin & Ricardo Villalobos, Sucioperro, Audioslave, Jimmy Eat World, Death From Above 1979, The Vale of Atholl Pipe Band, Eagles of Death Metal, Mylo, Athlete, Snoop Dogg, Queens of the Stone Age and Ian Brown. Saturday saw the return of the Foo Fighters, who came back to Scotland in dramatic style, headlining the main stage.

The 2005 line-up was as follows:

Main Stage

Radio 1/NME Stage

King Tut's Tent

X-Tent

Slam Tent

Futures Stage

T Break Stage

Links

References

2005 in Scotland
2005 in British music
T in the Park
July 2005 events in the United Kingdom
2005 music festivals